South Devon is the southern part of Devon, England. Because Devon has its major population centres on its two coasts, the county is divided informally into North Devon and South Devon. In a narrower sense "South Devon" is used to refer to the part of Devon south of Exeter and Dartmoor, including Plymouth, Torbay and the districts of South Hams, West Devon and Teignbridge.

South Devon is also sometimes, although incorrectly, taken to include East Devon, which includes the first seaside resort to be developed in the county, Exmouth and the more upmarket Georgian town of Sidmouth, headquarters of the East Devon District Council.

National character area 
South Devon is more precisely defined as a natural region which has been designated as National Character Area 151 by Natural England.

The South Devon National Character Area as defined by Natural England is bounded by the River Tamar in the west, the coastline from Plymouth to Torquay in the south, the southern boundary of Dartmoor in the north. Either side of Dartmoor it reaches as far north as Chillaton in the west and Chudleigh and Bovey Tracey in the east. Adjacent natural regions are the Cornish Killas to the west of the Tamar Valley, The Culm to the northwest and the Devon Redlands to the northeast.

Geography
The landscape of South Devon consists of rolling hills dotted with small towns, such as Dartmouth, Ivybridge, Kingsbridge, Salcombe, and Totnes. The towns of Torquay and Paignton are the principal seaside resorts on the south coast.  Another notable feature is the coastal railway line between Newton Abbot and the Exe Estuary: the red sandstone cliffs and sea views are very dramatic and in the resorts railway line and beaches are very near.

Notes

Geography of Devon
Natural regions of England